The Department of Finance is a department of the Government of Western Australia.

The department was formed on 1 July 2011 from the previously existing Department of Treasury and Finance. It is responsible for the construction and maintenance of government buildings, management of major Western Australian state projects, government procurement, administration of revenue and the grant and subsidy schemes.

The department was one of the few that remained mostly unaffected by the 2017 restructuring of the Western Australian government departments, which resulted in the number of departments being reduced from 41 to 25.

References

External links
 Government of Western Australia website
 Department of Finance

Finance
2011 establishments in Australia
Government agencies established in 2011